D-alanine—(R)-lactate ligase (VanA, VanB, VanD) is an enzyme with systematic name D-alanine:(R)-lactate ligase (ADP-forming). This enzyme catalyses the following chemical reaction

 D-alanine + (R)-lactate + ATP  D-alanyl-(R)-lactate + ADP + phosphate

The product of this enzyme can be incorporated into the peptidoglycan pentapeptide instead of the usual D-alanyl-D-alanine dipeptide.

References

External links 
 

EC 6.1.2